William Henry Broome (30 September 1873–8 June 1943) was a New Zealand clothier and tailor. He was born in Leek, Staffordshire, England on 30 September 1873.

References

1873 births
1943 deaths
English emigrants to New Zealand
New Zealand drapers
People from Leek, Staffordshire